Qazaxbəyli (also, Kazakhbeyli) is a village and municipality in the Qazakh Rayon of Azerbaijan.  It has a population of 1,158.

Notable natives 

 Alı Mustafayev, journalist and reporter, National Hero of Azerbaijan

References 

Populated places in Qazax District